Stijn Desmet (born 10 April 1998) is a Belgian short track speed skater.

Biography
Desmet was born in Duffel, lives in Mechelen, and is the younger brother of short track speed skater and Olympic bronze medalist Hanne Desmet.

Desmet started short track speed skating at a club in Wilrijk at the age of 10. In 2012, he was scouted by the Belgian short track national team coach Pieter Gysel to participate in the Sport Vlaanderen supported project "Be Gold" to train talented youth professionally in Hasselt, with the Winter Olympics as the main goal.

Desmet is the Belgian record holder in the 500 meters. At the 2016 Winter Youth Olympics in Lillehammer, Norway, he won a gold medal in the mixed relay event in an international team, alongside Desmet consisting of Quentin Fercoq (France), Ane Farstad (Norway) and Kim Ji-yoo (South Korea).

At the 2020 European Short Track Speed Skating Championships, Desmet finished 2nd in the closing super final, making him 5th in the final standings. At the 2021 European Short Track Speed Skating Championships, he was 12th in the final standings, and at the World Cup that year, Desmet finished in 9th place. 

At the Short track speed skating at the 2022 Winter Olympics in Beijing, Desmet was eliminated in the heats of the 1000 metres due to a penalty, ended 13th in the 1500 metres and was eliminated in the Quarterfinals of the 500 metres.

In April 2022, at the 2022 World Short Track Speed Skating Championships in Montreal, he won two bronze medals in one day, the 500 metres and the 1500 metres.

References

External links
 
 

1998 births
Living people
People from Duffel
Belgian male short track speed skaters
Olympic short track speed skaters of Belgium
Short track speed skaters at the 2022 Winter Olympics
Short track speed skaters at the 2016 Winter Youth Olympics
World Short Track Speed Skating Championships medalists
Sportspeople from Antwerp Province
21st-century Belgian people